Pepita, or pumpkin seed, is the edible seed of pumpkins or related squashes.

Pepita may also refer to:
Pepita glass engraving
The Pepita, later the Maria Asumpta, a brig that sailed from 1858 to 1995

In people
 Pepita de Oliva (1830–1871), Spanish dancer
 Pepita Pardell (1928-2019), Spanish animator, cartoonist, illustrator, painter

See also
Pepito (disambiguation)